Mathieu Razanakolona (born 2 August 1986) is a Malagasy-Canadian alpine skier, born to a Quebecois mother and a father from Madagascar, currently residing in Canada.

He competes in both slalom and giant slalom races. In January 2006 he made his debut in the Alpine skiing World Cup in Schladming, Austria, but he was disqualified from this competition.

He was Madagascar's only representative at the 2006 Winter Olympics, and their first ever Winter Olympics representative. The FIS gave him a wildcard entry into the 2006 Winter Olympics.

References

External links
 rAzAlpin.org
 Full canadien and malagasy press review
 

1986 births
Living people
Malagasy male alpine skiers
Canadian male alpine skiers
Skiers from Montreal
Alpine skiers at the 2006 Winter Olympics
Olympic alpine skiers of Madagascar
Malagasy people of Canadian descent
Canadian people of Malagasy descent